John Ferraby (January 9, 1914 – September 5, 1973)  was a British Baháʼí born in Southsea, England, into a liberal Jewish family. He was educated at Malvern College and King's College, Cambridge, to which he won a major scholarship. He became a Baháʼí in 1941 and was elected as secretary of the National Spiritual Assembly, which he remained until 1959.

In October 1957, Ferraby was appointed a Hand of the Cause of God by Shoghi Effendi. From 1959 to 1963, he served as one of the nine Custodians at the Baháʼí World Centre in Haifa, Israel.

Works 
 

All Things Made New is notable for the changes made from the original publication in 1957 to subsequent editions published after the passing of Shoghi Effendi.  For example, comparing the original 1957 edition to the 1987 edition, among the numerous alterations, is the replacement of his dedication of the book to "The First Guardian of the Baháʼí Faith" to simply "The Guardian."  Other references to "the Guardian" have been replaced with "the Universal House of Justice."

References

Bibliography 
 

1914 births
1973 deaths
20th-century Bahá'ís
People from Southsea
English Bahá'ís
English Jews
Hands of the Cause
Converts to the Bahá'í Faith from Judaism